The 2005–06 season of the Eerste Divisie began on August 12, 2005 and ended on April 7, 2006. The title was won by Excelsior Rotterdam.

Promoted teams
The following team was promoted to the Eredivisie at the end of the season:
Excelsior Rotterdam (champion)

Newly admitted teams
These teams were relegated from the Eredivisie at the start of the season:
De Graafschap (17th position, relegated through playoffs)
FC Den Bosch (18th position)

The following team was admitted to the Eerste Divisie at the start of the season:
FC Omniworld

League standings

Period winners
The competition is divided into six periods of six matches each. The winner of each period qualifies for the playoffs at the end of the season. If the winner of a period has already won a prior period in the season, the second placed team in the period is awarded the playoff slot. If the second placed team has also won a prior period, no winner is called, and the playoff slot is decided by league standing at the end of the season. If a team that has won a period goes on to win the league title and secure promotion to the Eredivisie, the playoff spot is awarded to the highest placed team on the final league standings that hasn't already qualified for the playoffs.

Playoffs
Round 1

Round 2 (best of 3)

|}

Round 3 (best of 3)

|}

No team was promoted to the Eredivisie.

Top scorers

See also
 2005–06 Eredivisie
 2005–06 KNVB Cup

External links
JupilerLeague.nl - Official website Eerste Divisie 

Eerste Divisie seasons
2005–06 in Dutch football
Neth